Guignol's Band is a 1944 novel by the French writer Louis-Ferdinand Céline. Set in the mid 1910s, the narrative revolves around Ferdinand, an invalided French World War I veteran who lives in exile in London, and follows his small businesses and interacting with prostitutes. It was followed by a sequel, London Bridge: Guignol's Band II, published posthumously in 1964.

Writing process
Louis-Ferdinand Céline spent a number of months in London after an injury in World War I, and the novel bears some autobiographical elements from that time. The French literature scholar Merlin Thomas wrote in his biography on Céline: "In the chronology of Céline's life as seen through the novels, Guignol's Band should be a massive insert in Voyage, coming immediately before the African section of that work."

Publication
The novel was first published by Éditions Denoël in April 1944 and received very little attention; Céline was highly unpopular at the time, due to his outspoken anti-Semitic stance in combination with the ongoing World War II. It was republished by Éditions Gallimard in 1952, and again did not receive much notice. In 1954 it was published in English.

See also
 1944 in literature
 20th-century French literature

References
Notes

Bibliography
 

1944 French novels
Novels by Louis-Ferdinand Céline
French autobiographical novels
French historical novels
Novels about British prostitution
Novels set in London
Novels set in the 1910s
Éditions Denoël books